Pokémon: Black & White: Adventures in Unova and Beyond (advertised as Pokémon: BW: Adventures in Unova and Beyond) also known as Pokémon: Black & White: Adventures in Unova (advertised as Pokémon: BW: Adventures in Unova), known in Japan as  and , , is the sixteenth season of the Pokémon animated series — the third and final season of Pokémon the Series: Black & White, known in Japan as Pocket Monsters: Best Wishes! (ポケットモンスター ベストウイッシュ, Poketto Monsutā Besuto Uisshu, literally "Pocket Monsters: Best Wishes!"). Ash makes his way back to Kanto with Iris joining so she can become a better Dragon Master and Cilan planning on improving his Connoisseur skills with Kanto-region Pokémon.

The Japanese opening songs are "Be an Arrow!" (やじるしになって!, Yajirushi ni Natte!), "Be an Arrow! 2013" (やじるしになって! 2013, Yajirushi ni Natte! 2013) by Rika Matsumoto and "Summerly Slope" (夏めく 坂道, Natsumeku Sakamichi) by Daisuke. The ending songs are the ending theme song of the lead-in short for the movie, Pokémon the Movie: Kyurem vs. the Sword of Justice, Meloetta's Moonlight Serenade, "Look Look☆Here" (みてみて☆こっちっち, Mite Mite☆Kotchitchi) by Momoiro Clover Z (桃色黒羽ゼット) to promote the short, "Sakura Go-Round" (サクラ・ゴーラウンド, Sakura Gō-Raundo) by Shiritsu Ebisu Chugaku (チュ学私立恵比寿), "Let's Join Hands" the ending theme song of the lead-in short for the movie, Pokémon the Movie: Genesect and the Legend Awakened, Pikachu & Eevee☆Friends, (手をつなごぅ, "Te o Tsunagō") by Shiritsu Ebisu Chugaku (私立恵比寿中学) to promote the short,  performed by J☆Dee'Z during the second Black & White anime special episode, and the English opening song is "It's Always You and Me" by Neal Coomer and Kathryn Raio. Its instrumental version serves as the ending theme. and the English opening song is "It's Always You and Me" by Neal Coomer and Kathryn Raio. Its instrumental version serves as the ending theme.

Episode list

Home media releases 
Viz Media and Warner Home Video released the entire series on a single 4-disc boxset on DVD in the United States on September 23, 2014 and March 24, 2015.

Viz Media and Warner Home Video released Pokémon: Black & White: Adventures in Unova and Beyond – The Complete Season on DVD on February 21, 2023.

Notes

References

External links 
 Pokémon anime website at TV Tokyo 
 Pocket Monsters: Best Wishes! website at TV Tokyo 
 Pokémon Anime television series at Pokémon JP official website 

2013 Japanese television seasons
Season16.120